Kiran Pawaskar, was elected to the Maharashtra Legislative Council on a Nationalist Congress Party ticket in 2011.He was a former Shiv Sena trade union leader.

Political career
Kiran Pawaskar  was the Member of the Legislative Council for the National Congress Party and leads his Trade Union in Maharashtra.  Now, he is a part of Balasahebanchi Shiv Sena political party
Kiran Pawaskar was a former general secretary of the Bharatiya Kamgar Sena.

References

Members of the Maharashtra Legislative Council
Living people
Marathi politicians
Shiv Sena politicians
Nationalist Congress Party politicians from Maharashtra
Year of birth missing (living people)